Oregon Iron Works, Inc. (OIW) is an American manufacturer of complex structural components and systems and specialized vehicles, located in the Clackamas area in the southeastern suburbs of Portland, Oregon (within the Portland metropolitan area).  Established in 1944, it is involved in a number of different industries, supplying products ranging from high-speed boats for military use to purpose-built girders for roadway bridges.  It has production facilities in Clackamas and in Vancouver, Washington, and currently employs about 400 people.  In May 2014, the company announced that it was merging with Portland-based Vigor Industrial.

United Streetcar 

In 2007, the company entered the field of streetcar (tram) manufacturing, after being awarded a contract, in January 2007, by the City of Portland for the provision of a prototype U.S.-manufactured streetcar for the Portland Streetcar system. The company had signed a technology transfer agreement with Škoda, of the Czech Republic, in February 2006, enabling it to offer to build the already existing Škoda 10 T design, under license from the Czech manufacturer.  Upon being awarded the contract, OIW created a new subsidiary, United Streetcar, LLC, for its streetcar manufacturing activity. The prototype streetcar was completed and delivered in mid-2009, and in August 2009 United Streetcar received a contract from the City of Portland for another six 10T streetcars.  The announcement of a second order for production-series vehicles soon followed, from the City of Tucson, Arizona. Washington D.C. also ordered two cars from United in April 2012 and a third in August 2012.

See also
Oregon Iron Works Sea Scout

References

External links 
 Website of OIW subsidiary United Streetcar, LLC
Oregon hopes to catch energy wave - Portland Tribune
Oregon Iron Works finds profit in high-tech, green products - The Oregonian

Aerospace companies of the United States
Defense companies of the United States
Manufacturing companies based in Oregon
Companies based in Clackamas County, Oregon
Privately held companies based in Oregon
1944 establishments in Oregon
Manufacturing companies established in 1944